"The Kiss Hello" is the 103rd episode of the NBC sitcom Seinfeld. This is the 17th episode for the sixth season. It aired on February 16, 1995. Although this was the 102nd episode to air, the cast and crew of the series credit this as the 100th episode because it is the 100th episode created. In this episode, Kramer posts the names and photos of all the tenants in his apartment building on a board in the lobby so that everyone will know each other. Jerry is uncomfortable with such pervasive socialization, bringing him to conflict with his neighbors at the same time as he investigates his Nana's story that his Uncle Leo owes his mother Helen $50.

Plot
Walking down the street, Jerry and George meet Elaine and her friend Wendy, a physical therapist. Jerry regrets once kissing Wendy on the cheek because now he has to kiss hello every time. George asks Wendy for treatment for a sore arm. Later, they discuss Wendy's 1960s-style hairdo that Elaine wishes she would change. Because only the bluntly frank Kramer would dare comment on it to her directly, they introduce him to her. However, Kramer loves the haircut, and tells her so. Flattered, Wendy starts dating him.

At Wendy's clinic, George is angry at her because he gets charged for an appointment he missed due to a family emergency, because of her 24-hour cancellation policy.

Kramer plans to put each tenant's picture and name up in the building's lobby so everybody will know each other. Jerry doesn't like the idea, so Kramer takes a surprise photo of Jerry for the wall. Jerry is unhappy when he finds himself obligated to engage everyone in the building in conversation and getting kissed hello by several of his neighbors. He finally tells them he is uncomfortable with being kissed. As a result, he is ostracized, the superintendent refuses to fix his shower, and his picture is defaced.

Jerry's Nana calls him to open up a bottle of ketchup. When Jerry goes to her apartment, Uncle Leo is also there. Nana reminds Leo to give $50 to Jerry's mother, Helen. Nana, who has been confusing past and present, is referring to an incident from Leo and Helen's childhood. Jerry asks his father, Morty, if Leo ever gave Helen the $50. An angry Morty calculates what the interest would be on $50 after 50 years, but Leo refuses to pay, saying they have no proof Nana's story is true. Leo puts Nana in a nursing home, presumably to stop her from talking about the $50. While visiting Nana at the home, he learns her old friend Buddy is also there. Buddy confirms the exact details of Nana's story, and Jerry declares Leo busted.

Wendy cancels her appointments to go skiing with Elaine. George points out the irony that she gave only a few hours notice. Upon returning from skiing, Wendy won't drive Elaine all the way back to her apartment due to one-way streets. Elaine is forced to carry her ski equipment the remaining three blocks home and injures her arm. She is infuriated when Wendy tries to charge her for treating the arm, so she and George both ridicule Wendy about her hairdo.

Kramer has a party in his apartment with the other tenants. When Jerry stops by to use his shower, Kramer tells him that he broke up with Wendy because she changed her hairstyle. He won't allow Jerry in because of the visiting tenants ostracizing him.

Production
Because "The Kiss Hello" was the 100th episode of Seinfeld to be produced, the cast and crew were all given commemorative "100th" jackets at the table-read for the episode.

Wendy's receptionist is played by Carol Leifer, a Seinfeld writer who was to some degree the real-life inspiration for the Elaine character. During table-reads, Leifer would often read the parts of minor characters who had not yet been cast; she was asked to play the part of the receptionist after reading it at the table-read.

References

External links 
 

Seinfeld (season 6) episodes
1995 American television episodes
Television episodes written by Larry David
Television episodes written by Jerry Seinfeld